Abáigar is a town and municipality located in the province and autonomous community of Navarre, northern Spain.

The municipality is part of the area (comarca) of Tierra Estella. It covers an area of 4.9 km². The municipality is located at a distance about 280 km northeast of Madrid, 47 km southwest of Pamplona.

The name comes from the Basque language (h)abe igar with the meaning of "dry tree".

Population

References

External links

 ABAIGAR in the Bernardo Estornés Lasa – Auñamendi Encyclopedia, Euskomedia Fundazioa 

Municipalities in Navarre